Óscar Engonga Maté (born 12 September 1968) is an Equatoguinean retired footballer who played as a midfielder, and a manager.

Football career
Engonga was born in Torrelavega, Cantabria. During his career, spent mainly in Spain's lower leagues but also comprising three La Liga matches, one for Real Valladolid and two with Racing de Santander, he retired as a footballer in 1999, aged only 30.

Shortly after, Engonga took up coaching, managing for a brief period Equatorial Guinea, which featured former fellow professionals in Spain Rodolfo Bodipo and Benjamín Zarandona. Subsequently, he served as technical assistant to his brother Vicente when the latter was in charge of the national team.

Personal life
Engonga came from a football family. His father Vicente was also a footballer who left Equatorial Guinea in 1958 and settled in Torrelavega, playing for Gimnástica de Torrelavega and other teams in the region. Óscar was the youngest of four brothers (all former players), the most prominent being older Vicente, who represented Spain at UEFA Euro 2000; Óscar and Vicente coincided at Gimnástica – with siblings Julio and Rafael – and Valladolid in the 1991–92 season.

Engonga's son, Igor, who was born in Santa Cruz de La Palma while he played in that city for CD Mensajero, represented Equatorial Guinea at both under-16 and senior level.

References

External links

1968 births
Living people
People from Torrelavega
Spanish sportspeople of Equatoguinean descent
Spanish footballers
Equatoguinean footballers
Footballers from Cantabria
Association football midfielders
La Liga players
Segunda División B players
Tercera División players
FC Barcelona C players
CD Mirandés footballers
Gimnástica de Torrelavega footballers
UP Langreo footballers
Real Valladolid players
CD Tudelano footballers
CD Toledo players
Racing de Santander players
UE Figueres footballers
CD Mensajero players
Racing de Ferrol footballers
Burgos CF footballers
CD Castellón footballers
Spanish football managers
Equatoguinean football managers
Equatorial Guinea national football team managers